The Final Rip Off is a compilation double album by Monty Python, released in 1987. It was the team's first release on Virgin Records, after the label acquired the rights to their back catalogue previously released on Charisma. The set contains material from those six albums, but not from the Life of Brian or The Meaning of Life soundtracks, which were released on other labels. Michael Palin added some new linking material while all the songs were remixed by producer Andre Jacquemin including one, "Henry Kissinger", which featured a previously unreleased section. Contrastingly, the selections from Another Monty Python Record and Live at Drury Lane were mixed from stereo into mono. The cover art, with its graphic image of spilling guts, was illustrated by Les Edwards.

Track listing

Side one
Introduction
Constitutional Peasant
Fish Licence
Eric the Half-a-Bee Song (remix)
Finland Song (remix)
Travel Agent
Are You Embarrassed Easily?
Australian Table Wines
Argument
Henry Kissinger Song (extended remix) 
Parrot (Oh, Not Again) (mono mix)

Side two
Sit On My Face (remix)
Undertaker (mono mix)
Novel Writing (Live From Wessex)
String
Bells
Traffic Lights
Cocktail Bar (mono mix)
Four Yorkshiremen (mono mix)
Election Special (mono mix)
Lumberjack Song (mono mix)

Side three
I Like Chinese (remix)
Spanish Inquisition Part 1 (mono mix)
Cheese Shop (remix)
Cherry Orchard (mono mix)
Architects Sketch (mono mix)
Spanish Inquisition Part 2 (mono mix)
Spam (mono mix)
Spanish Inquisition Part 3 (mono mix)
Comfy Chair (mono mix)
Famous Person Quiz (mono mix)
You Be the Actor (mono mix)
Nudge Nudge (mono mix)
Cannibalism (mono mix)
Spanish Inquisition Revisited (mono mix)

Side four
I Bet You They Won't Play This Song on the Radio (remix)
Bruces
Bookshop
Do Wot John (remix)
Rock Notes
I'm So Worried (remix)
Crocodile
French Taunter
Marilyn Monroe
Swamp Castle
French Taunter Part 2
Last Word

References 

Monty Python compilation albums
1987 compilation albums
Virgin Records compilation albums